Fred Robert Weintraub (April 27, 1928 – March 5, 2017) was an American film and television producer and writer.

Career

Background
Weintraub was the original owner and host of The Bitter End in New York City's Greenwich Village. Weintraub discovered singers and stand-up comedians such as Peter, Paul and Mary, Lenny Bruce (with whom he was arrested for obscenity), Randy Newman and The Isley Brothers. The club also featured early performances of Neil Diamond, Woody Allen, Frank Zappa and the Mothers of Invention, Ricky Nelson, Nina Simone, Dustin Hoffman, Charles Aznavour, Lily Tomlin, Stevie Wonder, Kris Kristofferson, Joni Mitchell, George Carlin, Bob Dylan, Harry Chapin, Bill Cosby and Phil Ochs. During the early 1960s The Bitter End hosted "Open Mike" Hootenannies every Tuesday night, showcasing young, old, known and unknown folksingers.

Weintraub is not related to fellow film producer Jerry Weintraub.

Films and television
Moving west in the mid 1960s, Weintraub created, wrote, and produced several television shows including Hootenanny and Dukes of Hazzard. Beginning with Rage then Enter the Dragon Weintraub produced dozens of movies, many with a martial arts theme, as well as directing a documentary on Bruce Lee, Bruce Lee: The Curse of the Dragon (1993).

In 1970 Weintraub became an Executive Vice President of Warner Bros. One of the first films he oversaw for the studio was Woodstock. In 1972 he became an independent producer, and made a number of adventure films, including Enter the Dragon, starring Bruce Lee.

One of Weintraub's documentary films was It's Showtime (1976) which consisted of film clips profiling various animal actors, such as Rin Tin Tin, Flipper, Trigger, and Asta, with commentary from the actors who worked with them, and including footage of James Cagney, Jimmy Durante, Cary Grant, Maureen O'Sullivan, Dick Powell, Ronald Reagan, and Mickey Rooney working with animal stars.

Other work 
In 2011, Weintraub published his memoir, Bruce Lee, Woodstock and Me, along with collaborator David Fields, recalling his fifty-year career in the entertainment industry.

Death 
Weintraub died on March 5, 2017, in his Pacific Palisades home due to natural causes related to Parkinson's disease. He was 88.

He is survived by his wife Jackie; children Sandra, Barbara, Max and Zachary; and four grandchildren.

Filmography

Producer

Writer

Director

Other credits

References

External links

1928 births
2017 deaths
Record producers from New York (state)
Film producers from New York (state)
People from Greenwich Village
People from the Bronx